Frannie is a town in Big Horn and Park counties in the U.S. state of Wyoming. The population was 157 at the 2010 census.

In 1894, Frannie's post office opened. Postmaster Morris, the town's first postmaster, had a daughter named Frannie, and the town was named after her. Until 1954, the legal status of Frannie was that of an unincorporated area taking in parts of Big Horn and Park Counties. In 1954, the town was incorporated. Under Wyoming law (WS 15-3-101), Frannie now has the status of an incorporated town having less than 4,000 people.

The town has a mayor-council form of government in which the governing body comprises the mayor and the council, together. The governing body has authority over the budget, other fiscal matters, and other major issues affecting the town. The current mayor is
Vance Peregoy, whose current term expires in 2022.

Frannie receives natural gas service from Frannie-Deaver Utilities, a privately held company in Frannie. Since 1955 the town has provided municipal (potable) water service. In 2000 the town installed a sanitary sewer system. The town contracts for its trash collection and fire-fighting services. Fire protection is provided by the Big Horn County Fire District #5 in Deaver, Wyoming. Police coverage is provided primarily by the Big Horn County Sheriff's Office.

Geography
Frannie is located at  (44.969738, -108.620340).  US Highway 310 (locally known as "Ash St.") is the main road through the town. All but 19 of the town's population is found east of US 310. The town is also located two miles south of the Montana border and is the northernmost town in Wyoming's Bighorn Basin—a mountain desert region which relies on a network of canals and pipelines to provide irrigation and potable water for the population, farming, and ranching activities.

The Town boundaries, at its eastern end, follow the Sage/Frannie Creek.

Among Wyoming towns Frannie has a unique geographic characteristic: it is the only town having boundaries which include parts of two counties—Big Horn (pop. 138) and Park (pop. 19.)  Accordingly, visitors to Frannie are greeted with a welcoming sign which includes the phrase "Biggest Little Town In Wyoming."  Locals say this designation is because "it took two counties to hold our town!"  Included in the Park County portion of Frannie is the post office and two of the town's three businesses.  The Town Hall is located within the Big Horn County portion.

Demographics

2010 census
As of the census of 2010, there were 157 people, 70 households, and 50 families residing in the town. There were 77 housing units. The racial makeup of the town was 95.5% White, 1.9% Native American, 1.9% African-American, 0% Asian, 0% from other races, and 0% from two or more races. Hispanic or Latino of any race were 7.6% of the population.  Some individuals identified as more than one race.  Thus these figures add-up to more than 100%.

Of the town's 70 households 30% had children under the age of 18 living with them, 54.3% were married couples living together, 14.3% had a female householder with no husband present, and 28.6% were non-families.  1.4% of all households had someone living alone who was 65 years of age or older. The average household size was 2.24 and the average family size was 2.64.

In the town, the population was spread out, with 24.8% under the age of 20, 7% from 20 to 29, 19.8% from 30 to 44, 31.8% from 45 to 64, and 16.5% who were 65 years of age or older. The median age was 43.3 years.

Media

AM radio
 KPOW 1260 AM  Country

FM radio
 KTAG 97.9 FM  Adult Contemporary
 KMXE 99.3 FM  Classic rock
 KZMQ-FM 100.3 Country
 KCGL 104.1 Classic rock
 KROW 107.1 Classic Hits

Television
Three television stations are available in Frannie: KSVI (ABC,) KTVQ (CBS) and KULR (NBC) from Billings.  Reception of additional TV stations is available, by subscription, from TCT West Telephone of Basin, Wyo. and from satellite ("dish") services.

Education
Public education in the town of Frannie is provided by Big Horn County School District #1. Campuses include Rocky Mountain Elementary School (grades PK-5) and Rocky Mountain High School (grades 6-12).  Both campuses are located in Cowley, Wyo.

Frannie has a public library, a branch of the Big Horn County Library System.

References

External links

Towns in Wyoming
Towns in Big Horn County, Wyoming
Towns in Park County, Wyoming